Thomas Carnduff, writer, was born on 30 January 1886 in Belfast and died in that city on 17 April 1956.

References

External links 
Thomas Carnduff at Writing from the north of Ireland
Thomas Carnduff Archive at Queen's University Belfast

Irish writers
1886 births
1956 deaths
Writers from Belfast